O Elvas Clube Alentejano de Desportos is a football club based in Elvas, Alentejo. It was founded in 1947 when the team S.L. Elvas and S.C. Elvas fused. Sport Lisboa e Elvas (founded in 1925) and O Elvas CAD spent several years in the Portuguese Liga, the main tier in the Portuguese football league system. Nowadays it plays in the Portalegre Regional Championships.

History
The club was founded on August 15, 1947, from the merger of "Sport Lisboa e Elvas" with "Sporting Clube Elvense", clubs that were branches of Sport Lisboa e Benfica and Sporting Clube de Portugal respectively. The union between the two clubs from Elvas was fundamentally due to the lack of interest shown by the so-called mother clubs, since in the mid-1940s, both SL Elvas and SC Elvense were experiencing some financial difficulties and given the lack of aid several times requested and refused by their mother clubs, they decided to unite in a single club and in this way, managed to keep the king sport alive in the interior region.
Thanks to the status of "SL Elvas", which already competed in the 1st Division, "O Elvas" continued it five times, in the 1940s. It debuted in 8th place in 1947/48, with victories against big clubs, such by 1/2 over SL Benfica, with two goals from Patalino or the 5/0 thrashing of Boavista and the 3/1 victory against SC Braga, followed by a 9th place in 1948/49 and 13th place in the following season, being, therefore, relegated to the second tier. Then returned to the 1st Division, in 1986/87, having finished in 16th place and, in the following season, ended up in 15th place, among 20 participating teams

On March 15, 1973, «O Elvas» F.C. XL first branch of O Elvas CAD was founded.
In between, a reference, for the national title of the 3rd Division, won in 1954/55, in addition to several honorable classifications in the 2nd and 3rd National Division. In 1980/81, "O Elvas" lost the final of the 3rd Division Nacional, with the title being won by CF União de Coimbra in the second phase of the competition.

When the crisis knocked on the door, the club went downhill until it descended to the District Championship of the Football Association of Portalegre and for that reason for years it only relied on its formation.
Currently the team is getting back on its feet, with a new president, new technical team and a young team, the main team returns this year to the 1st Division of AF de Portalegre, and with training teams, both at district and national level.

The club already had the modality of basketball, which participated in the competitions of the "Associação de Basquetebol do Alentejo", also in the youth and senior levels, but which currently has its activity suspended.

Season to season

References

Football clubs in Portugal
Association football clubs established in 1947
1947 establishments in Portugal
Primeira Liga clubs
Liga Portugal 2 clubs